Garcia College of Technology is the premier business and engineering school in Kalibo, Aklan. It was founded in 1968 by the late Don Florencio M. Garcia and Doña Enrica Reyes Garcia.

Courses offered

See also
 List of schools in Kalibo

References

Universities and colleges in Aklan